Love on a Leash is a 2011 romantic comedy film. It has become known for its unusual creative choices and is frequently included on lists of especially bad or bizarre movies.

Synopsis
Jana is a young woman who has not been lucky finding a romantic partner. She meets a golden retriever whom she names Prince (who also calls himself Alvin Flang). After discovering that Prince turns into a human man each night, Jana falls in love with him.

Cult status
Since release, Love on a Leash has earned notoriety as a cult film. It has been covered on movie podcasts such as How Did This Get Made? and The Flop House.

See also
 List of films considered the worst

References

External links
 

2011 films
2011 independent films
Films about dogs